Clydach Court Halt railway station served the village of Clydach, in the historical county of Glamorganshire, Wales, from 1917 to 1952 on the Ynysybwl branch line railway.

History 
The station was opened as Clydach Court Platform in July 1917 by the Taff Vale Railway, although an inspection was carried out on 16 October 1917 so it may have opened earlier. Its name was changed to Clydach Court Halt on 2 October 1922. It closed along with the line on 28 July 1952.

References 

Disused railway stations in Swansea
Railway stations in Great Britain opened in 1917
Railway stations in Great Britain closed in 1952
1917 establishments in Wales
1952 disestablishments in Wales